Smolensk South Airport is the former aerodrome of Smolensk in Smolensk Oblast, Russia, located 2 km south of the city. It was a civilian airfield with a small tarmac runway, until it stopped operating commercially in the early 2000s. There are many stored An-2s and a disused DOSAAF area. Once the main airports of the city of Smolensk, it remains active only for sporting use.

The aerodrome was given to the regional division of the DOSAAF.
The aerodrome operator is a Smolensk based aeroclub "Полёт" (Flight). The aerodrome is also the base of operations for "Smolenskaerotrans".

During its operational years planes as large as the Yak-40 and An-24 could land on the aerodrome. It could also accommodate any plane lighter than 24 tonnes , as well as any type of helicopter.

In 2008 the Smolensk Oblast government has put forward plans to modernise the airport and restart its commercial use.

It is not to be confused with the formerly military Smolensk North Airport 4 km north of the city.

References 

Defunct airports
Airports built in the Soviet Union
Airport
Airports in Smolensk Oblast